Juan Manuel Sanabria Magole (born 29 March 2000) is a Uruguayan professional footballer who plays as a midfielder for Liga MX club Atlético San Luis, on loan from La Liga club Atlético Madrid.

Club career
Sanabria was born in Florida, and joined Nacional's youth setup in 2012 from hometown side Club Nacional de Florida. In January 2017, Atlético Madrid reached an agreement with Nacional for the transfer of Sanabria, with the player joining his new club after his 18th birthday. He officially joined Atleti on 23 July 2018, being assigned to the Juvenil A squad.

Promoted to the reserves for the 2019–20 campaign, Sanabria made his senior debut on 24 August 2019, starting in a 2–1 Segunda División B away win against Marino de Luanco. His first senior goal came on 7 September, as he scored the winner in a 2–1 success at UP Langreo.

Sanabria made his first team debut for Atleti on 16 December 2020, coming on as a late substitute for Ángel Correa in a 3–0 away win against CD Cardassar, for the season's Copa del Rey. The following 26 January, he was loaned to Segunda División side Real Zaragoza for the remainder of the campaign.

Sanabria made his professional debut on 12 February 2021, replacing Sergio Bermejo in a 1–1 away draw against CE Sabadell FC.

International career
Sanabria is a former Uruguay youth international. With 88 caps for youth national teams, he have represented Uruguay at 2015 South American U-15 Championship, 2017 South American U-17 Championship, 2019 South American U-20 Championship, 2019 FIFA U-20 World Cup and 2020 CONMEBOL Pre-Olympic Tournament.

Career statistics

Club

Honours
Nacional U20
U-20 Copa Libertadores: 2018

Uruguay U20
 South American Games silver medal: 2018

References

External links
 
 

2000 births
Living people
Association football midfielders
Uruguayan footballers
Uruguay youth international footballers
Uruguay under-20 international footballers
Segunda División players
Segunda División B players
Liga MX players
Atlético Madrid footballers
Atlético Madrid B players
Real Zaragoza players
Atlético San Luis footballers
South American Games silver medalists for Uruguay
South American Games medalists in football
Uruguayan expatriate footballers
Uruguayan expatriate sportspeople in Spain
Uruguayan expatriate sportspeople in Mexico
Expatriate footballers in Spain
Expatriate footballers in Mexico